The Men's pentathlon P44 event for amputee athletes at the 2004 Summer Paralympics was held in the Athens Olympic Stadium on 22 September. It was won by Urs Kolly, representing .

References

M